Lowell station, officially the Charles A. Gallagher Transit Terminal, is an intermodal transit station in Lowell, Massachusetts. The transit complex includes an MBTA Commuter Rail station as well as the Robert B. Kennedy Bus Transfer Center, which serves local and intercity buses. It is located off Thorndike Street (MA 3A) near the end of the Lowell Connector south of downtown Lowell. The commuter rail station is the northern terminus of the Lowell Line, and is a major park-and-ride station for the system, serving commuters from Lowell, northern Massachusetts, and southern New Hampshire. The Kennedy Bus Transfer Center is the transfer point for all Lowell Regional Transit Authority local bus routes and several intercity bus routes by other operators.

Terminal and services

The Charles A. Gallagher Transit Terminal is an intermodal transit center at 101 Thorndike Street (MA 3A) near to Downtown Lowell.
The station is the northern terminus of the MBTA Lowell Line, which provides train service to and from Boston.

The Lowell Regional Transit Authority (LRTA) operates bus service from the Kennedy Bus Transfer Center to 14 communities. The Route 18 downtown shuttle links the terminal to downtown, with buses departing every 15 minutes during the week and every 30 minutes on Saturdays. Other services include the MVRTA Route 41 to Lawrence, OurBus service to New York City, and the Coach Company Foxwoods Line Run bus to Foxwoods Resort Casino.

The lobby at Gallagher Terminal includes a waiting area, a Dunkin' Donuts, and rest rooms.

Passengers access the train platform from the lobby via a bridge over the tracks. The platform is accessible with elevators in the lobby and at the train platform.

History 

The Charles A. Gallagher Transit Terminal opened in 1983. Previously, this area had held a depot for the Boston and Lowell Railroad.  To the east, Lowell had also been the location of a former Lowell and Andover Railroad, built by the Boston and Maine Railroad, station on Central and Green Streets known as Central Street Station, which is no longer in use.
In 2005, the Robert B. Kennedy Bus Transfer Center opened at the Gallagher Terminal as a new hub for all LRTA bus routes.

Historical services
Into the early 1960s Lowell Union Station was a junction point for Boston and Maine Railroad trains to Montreal and pooled New Haven Railroad and Boston and Maine pooled trains to Portland, Maine:
Boston North Station to Montreal via Essex Falls, Vermont:
Ambassador and overnight counterpart: New Englander
Boston to Montreal via Plymouth, New Hampshire and Newport, Vermont:
Alouette and overnight counterpart: Red Wing's
New York (Grand Central Terminal) - Portland Union Station, via Worcester, bypassing  Boston:State of Maine, year-round, overnight train
New York (Pennsylvania Station) - Portland Union Station via Worcester, also bypassing Boston:East Wind,'' summers only

References

External links 

MBTA - Lowell
Lowell Regional Transit Authority
Gallagher Terminal on Google Maps Street View

1983 establishments in Massachusetts
Buildings and structures in Lowell, Massachusetts
Bus stations in Middlesex County, Massachusetts
MBTA Commuter Rail stations in Middlesex County, Massachusetts
Railway stations in the United States opened in 1983
Stations along Boston and Maine Railroad lines
Transportation in Lowell, Massachusetts